A transscrotal piercing is a body piercing that travels through the scrotum from front to back, or from side to side. It is a high risk procedure.

Procedure 

This male genital piercing is an extremely advanced procedure, and is not done using a needle. Instead a scalpel or occasionally a dermal punch is used to make an incision, which is then followed by suturing the front to the back in order to create a viable fistula.  Large gauge jewelry is usually then inserted into the incision.  If the bond between the front and the back of the piercing holds, healing is very quick and easy.  Should a bond fail to form, healing can be lengthy and problematic.

This is a serious, complex piercing, and should an infection develop, it can develop within the scrotum and becomes dangerous very quickly.  This procedure is often considered to be a potentially dangerous surgical procedure, and is not by any means common.

Jewelry

Transscrotal piercings are usually healed with a barbell although teflon, tygon or other flexible inert jewelry can also be used.  Once healed, transscrotal piercings can be stretched quickly and, given the amount of surrounding tissue, to great size if desired.  A variety of jewelry can be used in healed transscrotal piercings, including large captive bead rings and plugs.  Jewelry for transscrotal piercings is often custom made.

History and culture

The transscrotal piercing is of contemporary origin, and has generally only been performed by practitioners of other "extreme" body modifications such as subdermal implants, transdermal implants and tongue splitting.  Like other "heavy" genital modifications, it may be performed under less than ideal situations by amateur practitioners as part of CBT or other BDSM activities.

It is also sometimes spelled transcrotal piercing or referred to as a "scrunnel" (short for scrotal tunnel).

References

External links
Body Modification Ezine article on Transscrotal piercing

Male genital piercings
Scrotum